The following list is a discography of production by Jazze Pha, an American hip hop record producer and recording artist from Atlanta, Georgia. It includes a list of songs produced, co-produced and remixed by year, artist, album and title.

Singles produced
 1996
 "Sho Nuff" (Tela featuring Eightball & MJG)
 1997
 "Tired of Ballin'" (Tela)
 1999
 "That Drama (Baby Mama)" (Jim Crow)
 "Better Than Me" (Terry Dexter)
 2001
 "Area Codes" (Ludacris featuring Nate Dogg)
 2002
 "Sick of Being Lonely" Field Mob
 2003
"Let's Get Down" (Bow Wow featuring Birdman)
"Let's Get Away" (T.I. featuring Jazze Pha)
 "Luv Me Baby" (Murphy Lee featuring Sleepy Brown & Jazze Pha)
 2004
 "1,2 Step" (Ciara featuring Missy Elliott)
 "Na-NaNa-Na" (Nelly featuring Jazze Pha)
 "Earthquake" (Lil Wayne featuring Jazze Pha)
 "I Wanna Thank Ya" (Angie Stone featuring Snoop Dogg)
 2005
 "Boogie Oogie Oogie" (Brooke Valentine Featuring Fabolous, Sonji Mickey) 
 "Incredible Feelin'" (Slim Thug featuring Jazze Pha)
 "So What" (Field Mob featuring Ciara)
 "Touching" (David Banner featuring Jazze Pha, Sonji Mickey)
 "Errtime" (Nelly featuring King Jacob & Jung Tru)
 "Nasty Girl" (Notorious B.I.G. featuring P Diddy, Nelly, Jagged Edge, Avery Storm, Jazze Pha & Fat Joe
 2006
 "I Know You Want Me" (Young Buck featuring Jazze Pha)
 "Get Up" (Ciara featuring Chamillionaire)
 "Unappreciated" (Cherish)
 2007
 "5000 Ones" (DJ Drama featuring Nelly, T.I., Yung Joc, Willie the Kid, Young Jeezy & Twista)
 "I Know You Want Me" Young Buck featuring Jazze Pha 
 2009
 "So Sharp" (Mack 10 featuring Rick Ross, Lil Wayne, & Jazze Pha)
 2010
 "Phone #" (Bobby V featuring Plies)
 2011
 2012
 "Sorry" (T.I. featuring Andre 3000)

1995
Erick Sermon - Double or Nothing
 15. "Man Above" (featuring Jazze Pha)

1996
Alfonzo Hunter - Blacka Da Berry
 08. "Groove On" (produced by Erick Sermon, co-produced by Jazze Pha)

Tela - Piece of Mind
 03. "Tired of Ballin'"
 07. "Sho Nuff"
 13. "Interlude - All About the Money" (produced with Slicse Tee & Insane Wayne)

1997
LSG - Levert.Sweat.Gill
 09. "Let A Playa Get His Freak On" (featuring Jazze Pha)

Lil Jon & the East Side Boyz - Get Crunk, Who U Wit: Da Album
 09. "Shawty Freak a Lil' Sumtin'" (featuring Jazze Pha)

1998
TQ - They Never Saw Me Coming
 03. "If the World was Mine"
 17. "The Comeback" (featuring Daz Dillinger and Kurupt)

Ras Kass - Rasassination
 10. "It is What It Is" (guest appearance)

1999
Jim Crow - Crow's Nest
 4.  "Hurry Too Much"
 8.  "One of These Days"
 10. "That Drama" (Baby Mama)

Dave Hollister - Ghetto Hymns
02. "Came in the Door Pimpin'"
04. "Round and Round" (co-produced by Teddy Bishop)

Men of Vizion - MOV
 01. "I Think About It" (produced with Kenneth "K-Fam" Fambro)

Too Short - Can't Stay Away
 07. "Good Life" (Guest Appearance)

Slick Rick - The Art of Storytelling
 03. "Street Talkin'" (featuring Outkast)

Terry Dexter - Terry Dexter
 01. "Better Than Me"

Ideal - Ideal
 01. "Intro"
 16. "Sexy Dancer"
 17. "Outro"

2000
Toni Braxton - The Heat
 05. "Gimme Some" (featuring Lisa "Left Eye" Lopes) (produced with Babyface)

8Ball & MJG - Space Age 4 Eva
 03. "Thingz"
 08. "Pimp Hard"

E-40 - Loyalty and Betrayal
 04. "Ya Blind" (featuring Jazze Pha & Eightball)

2001
Lil Jon & the East Side Boyz -  Put Yo Hood Up
 16. "I Like Dem Girlz" (featuring Jazze Pha)

T.I. - I'm Serious
 11. "Chooz U" (featuring Jazze Pha)

Ludacris - Word Of Mouf
 07. "Area Codes" (featuring Nate Dogg)
 13. "Keep It on the Hush" (featuring Jazze Pha)

MC Breed - The Fharmacist
 02. "Let's Go to the Club" (featuring Jazze Pha)

Lisa Lopes - Supernova
 05. "Jenny" (featuring Jazze Pha)

2002
Yasmeen Sulieman - When Will It Be Me
01. "Blue Jeans"

Tela - Double Dose
 7. "25 Hoes" (featuring 8Ball & MJG and Jazze Pha)

2Pac - Better Dayz
 CD1 04. "Changed Man" (featuring Jazze Pha)
 CD1 10. "Fair Exchange" (featuring Jazze Pha)
 CD2 05. "U Can Call" (featuring Jazze Pha)

Aaliyah - I Care 4 U
 10. "Don't Worry" (Previously Unreleased)
 11. "Come Over"

Nappy Roots - Watermelon, Chicken & Gritz
 06. "Awnaw" (featuring Jazze Pha)

Lil Wayne - 500 Degreez
 02. "Look At Me"
 15. "Believe That" (featuring Mannie Fresh)
 19. "Get That Dough" (featuring Baby)

Arrested Development - Heroes of the Harvest
 02. "In Tha South" (featuring Jazze Pha)

Big Tymers - Hood Rich
 04. "Sunny Day"
 08. "I'm Comin'"

Baby - Birdman
 03. "Fly In Any Weather" (featuring Jazze Pha)
 11. "On The Rocks"
 13. "Heads Up"
 18. "Do That ..."
 19. "Ice Cold"

Field Mob - From tha Roota to tha Toota
 05. "Sick Of Being Lonely"
 14. "All I Know" (featuring Cee-Lo Green)

 Pastor Troy - Universal Soldier
 09. "U Can't Pimp Me" (Featuring Pimpin Ken).
 11. "Undefeated".

2003
Bow Wow - Unleashed
 02. "Let's Get Down" (featuring Baby)
 08. "I Can't Lose"
 09. "Hey Little Mama"(featuring Jagged Edge).

Fiend - Can I Burn? 2
 05. "From Round Here" (featuring Snoop Dogg & Lil Jon)

T.I. - Trap Muzik
 06. "Let's Get Away" (featuring Jazze Pha)

Boo & Gotti - Perfect Timing
 13. "Ride Tonight" (featuring Jazze Pha & Baby)
 16. "Hot Shit" (featuring Mikkey, Baby & D-Boyz)

YoungBloodZ - Drankin' Patnaz
 14. "Mind On My Money" (featuring Jazze Pha)

Keith Murray - He's Keith Murray
 10. "Say Whattt" (featuring Redman)

Rated R -
Da Ghetto Psychic
 06. "Gotta Girl" 
 14. "My Check" (Featuring Jazze Pha).

Murphy Lee - Murphy's Law
 05. "Luv Me Baby"

Too Short - Married to the Game
 01. "Choosin'" (featuring Jagged Edge & Jazze Pha)

Monica - After The Storm
 12. "That's My Man"

Kokane - Dr. Jekyll and Mr. Kane
 09. "I'm a Rider" (featuring Jagged Edge and Snoop Dogg)

2004
ATL - The ATL Project
 01. "I Wish" (featuring Ciara)

Cassidy - Split Personality
 03. "Lipstick" (featuring Jazze Pha)(co-produced by Swizz Beatz)

Juelz Santana - From Me to U
 19. "Now What" (featuring T.I.)

Angie Stone - Stone Love
 02. "I Wanna Thank Ya" (featuring Snoop Dogg)

Lil Jon & the East Side Boyz -  Crunk Juice
 07. "Contract" (featuring Trillville & Pimpin' Ken)

Fantasia - Free Yourself
 11. "Don't Act Right" (featuring Jazze Pha)

Ciara - Goodies
 02. "1, 2 Step"
 03. "Thug Style"
 06. "Pick up the Phone"
 07. "Lookin' At You"

T.I. - Urban Legend
 07. "Get Loose" (featuring Nelly)

Various artists - NBA Live 2005 soundtrack
 00. "It's In The Game" (Murphy Lee featuring Jazze Pha & Jody Breeze)

Various artists - GAP: Favorite Songs
 06. "Let's Stay Together" (Michelle Williams)

Lil Wayne - Tha Carter
 19. "Earthquake" (featuring Jazze Pha)

Nelly - Sweat
 02. "Na-Nana-Na" (featuring Jazze Pha)

Nelly - Suit
 02. "Pretty Toes" (featuring T.I. & Jazze Pha)

Jacki-O - Poe Little Rich Girl
 03. "Break You Off" (featuring Jazze Pha)

2005
Trick Trick - The People vs.
 05. "Attitude Adjustment" (featuring Jazze Pha)

Trina - Glamorest Life
 07. "It's Your B-Day" (featuring Jazze Pha)

Jody Breeze - A Day in the Life of Jody Breeze
 All Tracks (Except For Take It Outside, Stackin Paper, and Who Dat.)

Twista - Kamikaze
 06. "Still Feels So Good"
 08. "Badunkadunk"

David Banner - Certified
 06. "Touching" (featuring Jazze Pha)
 13. "Take Your" (featuring Jazze Pha)

Boyz N Da Hood - Boyz N Da Hood
 04. "Felonies"
 12. "Happy Jamz" (featuring Jazze Pha)
 15. "Pussy M.F.'s" (featuring Trick Daddy)

Mariah Carey - Emancipation of Mimi
07. "Tonight" (featuring Nelly & Jazze Pha)

Bun B - Trill
 08. "I'm Ballin" (featuring Jazze Pha)

Young Jeezy - Let's Get It: Thug Motivation 101
 12. "Bang" (featuring T.I. & Lil' Scrappy)

Ginuwine - Back II da Basics
 03. "Secrets" (featuring Jazze Pha)

Various artists - The Longest Yard: The Soundtrack
 01. "Errtime" (Nelly featuring Jung Tru & King Jacob)

YoungBloodZ - Ev'rybody Know Me
 12. "Play Ur Position" (featuring Jazze Pha)

Slim Thug - Already Platinum
 08. "Everybody Loves A Pimp"
 14. "Incredible Feelin'" (featuring Jazze Pha)

Notorious B.I.G. - Duets: The Final Chapter
 09. "Nasty Girl" (featuring P Diddy, Nelly, Jagged Edge, Avery Storm, Jazze Pha & Fat Joe)

Brooke Valentine - Chain Letter
Leftover
 00. "Boogie Oogie" (featuring Fabolous & Yo-Yo)

2006
Young Dro - Best Thang Smokin'
 05. "U Don't See Me" (featuring Slim Thug)
 13. "Fresh"
 14. "What It Is"

Cherish - Unappreciated
 01. "That Boi"
 04. "Unappreciated"
 06. "Stop Calling Me"
 13. "He Said, She Said"

Rick Ross - Port of Miami
 08. "For da Low"

Sammie - Sammie
 01. "Feelin' It"
 03. "You Should Be My Girl" (featuring Sean Paul of YoungBloodz)

Too Short - Blow the Whistle
 07 "Strip Down" (Un-Credited Guest Appearance)
 08 "Nothing Feels Better" (Un-Credited Guest Appearance)
 09 "Sophisticated" (Un-Credited Guest Appearance)
 10 "Playa" (Un-Credited Guest Appearance)
 11 "16 Hoes" (featuring Bun B) (Guest Appearance)

Pimp C - Pimpalation
 06. "The Honey" (featuring Jody Breeze) (Guest Appearance)
 15. "On Your Mind" (featuring Jagged Edge, Big Zack, Ali & Gipp)

Field Mob - Light Poles and Pine Trees
 02. "So What" (featuring Ciara)

LeToya Luckett - LeToya
 00. "Tear Da Club Up" (featuring Jazze Pha & Bun B)

Ciara - Ciara: The Evolution
 12. "Get Up" (featuring Chamillionaire)

2007
Keyshia Cole - Just Like You
 12. "Centerfold"

8Ball & MJG - Ridin High
 14. "Pimpin Don't Fail Me Now" (Feat Jazze Pha & Juvenile)

A Girl Called Jane
 00. "He's Alive"

Nephu
 00. "Choose you"

DJ Drama - Gangsta Grillz: The Album
 07. "5000 Ones" featuring Nelly, T.I., Yung Joc, Willie The Kid, Young Jeezy, & Twista

Rasheeda - Dat Type of Gurl
 12. "Holla At Me" (featuring Birdman & Jazze Pha)

Bone Thugs-n-Harmony - Strength & Loyalty
Leftover
 "Certified Thugs"

Lil Skeeter - Midwest Mastermind
 10. "I Already Hit Dat Shit" (featuring Snoop Dogg)

Echo - Echo Presenta: Invasion
 04. "Caliente" (Daddy Yankee featuring Jazze Pha)

Bar-Kays - House Party
 01. "Sho-Nuff" (featuring Jazze Pha)

Young Buck - Buck the World
 15. "4 Kings" (featuring T.I., Young Jeezy & Pimp C)
 16. "I Know You Want Me" (featuring Jazze Pha)

Twista - Adrenaline Rush 2007
 06. "Say Say" (featuring Cee-Lo, Jazze Pha & Big Zak)

UGK - Underground Kingz
 03. "Stop-N-Go" (featuring Jazze Pha)
 08. "Tell Me How Ya Feel"

Mary J. Blige - Growing Pains
 03. "Just Fine" (produced with Tricky Stewart)
 07. "Shake Down" (featuring Usher) (produced with Tricky Stewart)

Chris Brown - Exclusive
 12. "Gimme Whatcha Got (Co-Produced By The-Dream)
Leftover
 00. "One More Chance"

2008
Bun B - II Trill
 "My Block" (Guest Appearance)

Usher - Here I Stand
 03. "This Ain't Sex" (co-produced with Tricky Stewart)

Girlicious - Girlicious
 08. "My Boo"
 11. "It's Mine"
 14. "Like Me"

Mario
00. "Green Light"

Cherish - The Truth
 07. "Superstar"
 11. "Like A Drum"

C-Side - Class in Session: The Boyfriend/Girlfriend EP
 02. "MySpace Freak" (featuring Jazze Pha)

T.I. - Paper Trail
Leftover
00. "Like I Do" (featuring The-Dream)

2009
Day26 - Forever in a Day
 14. "Your Heels"

Asher Roth - Asleep in the Bread Aisle
 10. "Bad Day" (Guest Appearance)

Angie Stone - Unexpected
 03. "Free"

Usher
 Block Blockin'

2010
Jessica Mauboy - Get 'Em Girls 02. "Handle It"

2011Bobby V - Fly on the Wall
 15. "Phone #" (feat. Plies)

E-40 - Revenue Retrievin': Night Shift
 03.  	"Can't Stop the Boss" (feat. Snoop Dogg, Too Short & Jazze Pha)

2012
T.I. - Trouble Man: Heavy is the Head
 06. "Sorry" (featuring Andre 3000)

2013
August Alsina - The Product 2
07. "Hell Yea" (featuring Juelz Santana)

Louie V Gutta - Worth the Wait
 02. "Worth The Wait" (featuring Jazze Pha)

2015
Zona Man - No Advance
05. "Plug"

Young Greatness
 Moolah

2016
13th Floor - School Daze
05. "Digits" (performed by Mannish Mania)

Snoop Dogg - Coolaid
16. "Double Tap" (featuring E-40 and Jazze Pha)

References

External links
 
 
 
 

Production discographies
Discographies of American artists
Hip hop discographies